Santiago Roberto Salazar Peña (born November 2, 1975) is a Peruvian retired football defender.

Club career
He had three spells with Peruvian First Division club Sport Boys, playing as a center back.

International career
Salazar played for the Peru national team 13 times between 1998 and 2006.

External links

References

1975 births
Living people
Footballers from Lima
Peruvian footballers
Peru international footballers
2001 Copa América players
Sport Boys footballers
Sporting Cristal footballers
Trabzonspor footballers
Club Deportivo Universidad de San Martín de Porres players
Al-Shamal SC players
Club Alianza Lima footballers
Club Deportivo Universidad César Vallejo footballers
José Gálvez FBC footballers
Peruvian Primera División players
Süper Lig players
Peruvian expatriate footballers
Expatriate footballers in Turkey
Expatriate footballers in Qatar
Association football defenders